Alexander Michael Bass (born 1 April 1998) is an English professional footballer who plays as a goalkeeper for EFL Championship club Sunderland.

Club career

Portsmouth 
Born in Eastleigh, Bass progressed through Portsmouth's youth categories. He first appeared on the first team bench on 7 March 2015 at the age of 16, he went onto feature on the Portsmouth bench a further 36 times before making his debut in a 3–2 defeat at Coventry City in the EFL Cup on the 9 August 2016.

Salisbury (loan) 
On 16 August 2016, Bass was loaned to Southern League South & West side Salisbury in an initial one-month deal, before returning to Portsmouth at the end of the season.

Return to Portsmouth 
On 5 May 2018, Bass made his first league start for Pompey, keeping a clean sheet in the 2–0 home win in their final League One game of the season against Peterborough. Four days later, the club took up the option of extension on his contract and renewed it for a further year.

Torquay United (loan) 
On 9 July 2018, Bass signed a new three-year contract at Portsmouth and moved on loan to National League South side Torquay United for their 2018–19 title winning season.

Bradford City (loan) 
He moved on loan to Bradford City in January 2022.

Southend United (loan) 
On 27 February 2021, Bass joined Southend United on an emergency loan, for the remainder of the 2020–21 season.

Sunderland 
On 26 July 2022, Bass signed for Sunderland on a three-year deal.

Honours

Club
Portsmouth
EFL Trophy: 2018–19
PFA League One Player of the Month February 2020 Bass Wins PFA Award

Career statistics

References

Living people
1998 births
English footballers
Association football goalkeepers
Portsmouth F.C. players
Salisbury F.C. players
Torquay United F.C. players
Bradford City A.F.C. players
Sunderland A.F.C. players
English Football League players
National League (English football) players
Southern Football League players
People from Eastleigh
Footballers from Hampshire